Auf Wiedersehen is the first full-length album, released by thrash metal band Equinox. It was released in 1989.

Track listing

1990 debut albums
Bertelsmann Music Group albums
Equinox (thrash metal band) albums